George Keppa is a professional rugby league footballer who plays on the  for Brisbane Norths in Australia. He is a Papua New Guinea international.

He has been named in the Papua New Guinea training squad for the 2008 Rugby League World Cup.

He has been named in the PNG squad for the 2008 Rugby League World Cup.

References

External links

Living people
Australian people of Papua New Guinean descent
Norths Devils players
Papua New Guinea national rugby league team players
Papua New Guinean rugby league players
Rugby league wingers
Year of birth missing (living people)